The 28th Mechanized Infantry Division (28. Mekanize Piyade Tümeni) is an infantry formation of the Turkish Land Forces.

In 1941 the 28th Infantry Division was part of IV Corps Çatalca Area, First Army. It was deployed from Ankara under 6th Corps to Cyprus for the Turkish invasion of Cyprus in 1974.

Since the 1970s it has formed part of 11th Corps/Cyprus Turkish Peace Forces. Major General Hilmi Özkök commanded the division in 1988-90.

In June 2022 the division's 230th Mechanised Infantry Regiment reportedly held an "Early Intervention Force" exercise.

References

Further reading
Scott Leckie, Housing and Property Restitution Rights of Refugees and Displaced Persons: Laws, Cases, and Materials, Cambridge University Press, 2007 (p. 448)

External links
Permanent Representative of Cyprus, 2007 letter to Secretary-General 

Mechanized divisions of Turkey